Fafen River is a river of eastern Ethiopia. Rising to the east of Harar, it cuts through a series of wide, flat shelves of sedimentary rocks made of sandstone, limestone, and gypsum as it descends in a south-eastern direction towards the Shebelle River. The Fafen only joins the Shebelle river during times of heavy rainfall.

See also 
 List of rivers of Ethiopia

References 

Rivers of Ethiopia
Shebelle River
Somali Region